The north-eastern orange-tailed slider (Lerista orientalis) is a species of skink found in the Northern Territory and Queensland in Australia.

References

Lerista
Reptiles described in 1889
Taxa named by Charles Walter De Vis